This is a list of members of the South Australian House of Assembly from 1905 to 1906, as elected at the 1905 state election:

 Murray MHA Walter Hughes Duncan died on 12 May 1906. Hermann Homburg won the resulting by-election on 23 June.

References

External links
History of South Australian elections 1857–2006, volume 1: ECSA

Members of South Australian parliaments by term
20th-century Australian politicians